Zacorisca daphnaea is a species of moth of the  family Tortricidae. It is found on New Guinea.

The wingspan is 22–30 mm. The forewings are bluish white with a fine dark blue line round the base and basal portions of the costa and dorsum. There is a deep coppery-ferruginous apical patch. The hindwings are dark purple fuscous or dark grey.

References

	

Moths described in 1924
Zacorisca